The Alcolu Railroad was a shortline railroad that served South Carolina in the early 20th century. It was incorporated in 1902 to help to carry passengers and freight from Alcolu, South Carolina, in Clarendon County, to Beulah, which was renamed Olanta.  Freight service was extended to Ham, in Florence County. For a short time, a passenger service ran from Olanta to Kirby once a week.

Route
 Alcolu, junction with Central Railroad of South Carolina, later (Atlantic Coast Line)
 McLeod, 2 miles
 Harby, 5 miles
 DuRant, 7 miles  
 Gable, 11 miles  (after 1914 when Black River Cypress built mill)
 Sardinia, 12 miles
 Gamble's Store, 14 miles  (Renamed New Zion after Gamble's death ) 
 Beards, 15 miles 
 Coles, 17 miles  (Renamed Seloc in 1905]
 Paroda Junction, 20 miles, junction with Paroda Railroad
 Hudson, 21 miles
 Beulah, 25 miles,  (Renamed Olanta in 1908) 
 Kirby, 29 miles  [Passenger service once a week]
 Ham, 32.8 miles  [Freight service only]

Closure
It was abandoned on June 4, 1936.

References

 Local Newspapers, and public timetables

External links

Logging Railroads of South Carolina, Thomas Fetters, 1989

Defunct South Carolina railroads
Railway companies established in 1902
Railway companies disestablished in 1936
1902 establishments in South Carolina
1936 disestablishments in South Carolina
American companies established in 1902
American companies disestablished in 1936